R620 road may refer to:
 R620 road (Ireland)
 R620 (South Africa)